Ringbang is variously a Caribbean fusion of music genres, a philosophy, and an aesthetic propounded by Eddy Grant in 1994.

In an interview circa 2000, Grant defined ringbang like this:

In applying ringbang to music, Grant attempted to define a meta-style to encompass all Caribbean rhythms; it was to be a musical lingua franca. He wished this multicultural style to place no restrictions on instrumentation, and he said that he wanted no single country or culture to lay claim to it. Among ringbang's stylistic influences are calypso, reggae, soca, tuk, and zouk.

Grant says that the word "ringbang" comes from vocalists scat singing "Ringa-ringa-ringbang!". He chose the word one day in 1993, while standing in recording engineer Frank Agarrat's backyard in Trinidad.

Ringbang music
In an attempt to popularise ringbang music and its underlying philosophy, Grant asked various recording artists to apply the word (which he trademarked) to some of their songs. Barbadian recording artists Grynner, Square One, Viking Tundah, and others recorded ringbang tracks for Grant's record labels, Ice Records and Blue Wave Records. Among the ringbang albums on these labels were Fire in de Wave (1994), Ringbang Rebel Dance (1995), Ringbang Souljah (1996), and Ringbang Revolution (1997).

On New Year's Eve 1999, Grant hosted a concert in Tobago called Ringbang Celebration 2000, at which he performed with the Frontline Orchestra. The event drew approximately 11,000 people, and featured performances by artists from Antigua, Barbados, and Trinidad and Tobago. Calypso musician Lord Kitchener's brief appearance at the event was his final time onstage, as he died the following February.

In March 2003, Ice Records published Ringbang 4 Kids, a selection of songs intended for children of primary school age. The songs were performed by Barbadian singer Indra Rudder, who had previously sung backing vocals for several Ice Records tracks.

See also
 African aesthetic
 Caribbean Carnival
 List of Caribbean music genres

References

Further reading
 
 
 
 

Aesthetics
Barbadian music
Caribbean music genres
Zouk